Rashtriya Prajatantra Party-Chand (translation: National Democratic Party-Chand) was a Nepalese political party. It was a right-wing pro-monarchy party, formed out of the political elite of the erstwhile Panchayat system.

The party was first founded in 1997 when a faction of the Rastriya Prajatantra Party led by Lokendra Bahadur Chand joined a coalition government with Communist Party of Nepal (Unified Marxist–Leninist), with Chand as Prime Minister. The faction led by Surya Bahadur Thapa allied itself with Nepali Congress and toppled the UML-RPP government. In 1998 the party was reunited, after both factions had fared badly in the elections that year.

References

Political parties in Nepal